The A.G. Bartlett Building is a 14-floor building at 215 W 7th St Street in Downtown Los Angeles, California. When completed in 1911, it was the tallest building in the city for five years.

It is within the Spring Street Financial District, a historic district listed on the National Register of Historic Places.

The Bartlett Building was designed by John B. Parkinson and Edwin Bergstrom, in the Beaux Arts style.

The building was converted to 130 residential loft condominium units, and ground floor retail spaces in 2002, under the Los Angeles Adaptive Reuse Ordinance.

References

External links
 The Parkinson Architectural Archives: Bartlett Building

Buildings and structures in Downtown Los Angeles
Residential skyscrapers in Los Angeles
Commercial buildings completed in 1911
1911 establishments in California
1910s architecture in the United States
Historic district contributing properties in California
John and Donald Parkinson buildings
Beaux-Arts architecture in California
National Register of Historic Places in Los Angeles
Adaptive reuse of industrial structures in Greater Los Angeles